The 1961 Philadelphia Phillies season was the 69th in franchise history. The Phillies finished the season in last place in the National League at 47–107, 46 games behind the NL Champion Cincinnati Reds. The team also lost 23 games in a row, the most in the majors since 1900.

Offseason 
 November 28, 1960: Choo-Choo Coleman was drafted by the Phillies from the Los Angeles Dodgers in the 1960 rule 5 draft.

Regular season

Season standings

Record vs. opponents

Notable transactions 
 May 4, 1961: Turk Farrell and Joe Koppe were traded by the Phillies to the Los Angeles Dodgers for Charley Smith and Don Demeter.
 June 1, 1961: Warren Hacker was purchased from the Phillies by the Chicago White Sox.
 July 2, 1961: Bobby Del Greco was traded by the Phillies to the Kansas City Athletics for Wes Covington.

1961 Game log

|- style="background:#fbb"
| 1 || April 11 || @ Dodgers || 2–6 || Don Drysdale (1–0) || Robin Roberts (0–1) || Larry Sherry (1) || 50,927 || 0–1
|- style="background:#fbb"
| 2 || April 12 || @ Dodgers || 2–3 || Johnny Podres (1–0) || Frank Sullivan (0–1) || Larry Sherry (2) || 10,694 || 0–2
|- style="background:#bfb"
| 3 || April 13 || @ Dodgers || 8–7 || Turk Farrell (1–0) || Ed Palmquist (0–1) || None || 10,312 || 1–2
|- style="background:#fbb"
| 4 || April 14 || @ Giants || 0–2 || Mike McCormick (1–1) || Art Mahaffey (0–1) || None || 19,989 || 1–3
|- style="background:#bfb"
| 5 || April 15 || @ Giants || 2–0 || Dallas Green (1–0) || Juan Marichal (0–1) || None || 18,755 || 2–3
|- style="background:#fbb"
| 6 || April 16 || @ Giants || 2–5 || Sam Jones (1–0) || Robin Roberts (0–2) || Billy O'Dell (1) || 23,594 || 2–4
|- style="background:#bbb"
| – || April 18 || Braves || colspan=6 | Postponed (rain); Makeup: July 19 as a traditional double-header
|- style="background:#bbb"
| – || April 19 || Braves || colspan=6 | Postponed (rain and cold weather); Makeup: August 25 as a traditional double-header
|- style="background:#fbb"
| 7 || April 20 || Braves || 6–7 (11) || Ron Piché (1–0) || John Buzhardt (0–1) || None || 9,531 || 2–5
|- style="background:#fbb"
| 8 || April 21 || Cubs || 2–3 || Don Cardwell (1–0) || Robin Roberts (0–3) || Don Elston (1) || 5,738 || 2–6
|- style="background:#fbb"
| 9 || April 22 || Cubs || 4–6 (11) || Don Elston (3–0) || Turk Farrell (1–1) || None || 3,996 || 2–7
|- style="background:#bfb"
| 10 || April 23 (1) || Cubs || 1–0 || Frank Sullivan (1–1) || Dick Ellsworth (0–1) || None || see 2nd game || 3–7
|- style="background:#bfb"
| 11 || April 23 (2) || Cubs || 6–0 || Art Mahaffey (1–1) || Bob Anderson (0–2) || None || 16,027 || 4–7
|- style="background:#bbb"
| – || April 25 || @ Pirates || colspan=6 | Postponed (rain and wet grounds); Makeup: June 25 as a traditional double-header
|- style="background:#fbb"
| 12 || April 26 || @ Pirates || 2–3 || Vinegar Bend Mizell (2–0) || Dallas Green (1–1) || None || 9,420 || 4–8
|- style="background:#fbb"
| 13 || April 28 || @ Cardinals || 9–10 (11) || Al Cicotte (1–2) || Dallas Green (1–2) || None || 5,620 || 4–9
|- style="background:#bfb"
| 14 || April 29 || @ Cardinals || 3–2 || Art Mahaffey (2–1) || Ray Sadecki (1–1) || None || 6,175 || 5–9
|- style="background:#bfb"
| 15 || April 30 || @ Cardinals || 11–7 (10) || Turk Farrell (2–1) || Larry Jackson (0–2) || None || 8,194 || 6–9
|-

|- style="background:#fbb"
| 16 || May 1 || @ Reds || 2–3 || Jim O'Toole (2–2) || Robin Roberts (0–4) || None || 2,089 || 6–10
|- style="background:#fbb"
| 17 || May 2 || @ Reds || 2–3 || Ken Hunt (2–1) || Dallas Green (1–3) || Jim Brosnan (3) || 3,026 || 6–11
|- style="background:#fbb"
| 18 || May 3 || @ Reds || 3–9 || Jim Maloney (1–1) || John Buzhardt (0–2) || Bill Henry (1) || 4,018 || 6–12
|- style="background:#fbb"
| 19 || May 4 || @ Reds || 0–4 || Joey Jay (1–3) || Art Mahaffey (2–2) || None || 3,087 || 6–13
|- style="background:#fbb"
| 20 || May 5 || Giants || 2–4 || Juan Marichal (2–1) || Frank Sullivan (1–2) || None || 15,674 || 6–14
|- style="background:#bbb"
| – || May 6 || Giants || colspan=6 | Postponed (rain); Makeup: July 28 as a traditional double-header
|- style="background:#fbb"
| 21 || May 7 || Giants || 0–7 || Billy Loes (3–1) || Robin Roberts (0–5) || None || 9,985 || 6–15
|- style="background:#fbb"
| 22 || May 8 || Dodgers || 3–4 (10) || Turk Farrell (3–1) || Chris Short (0–1) || None || 8,529 || 6–16
|- style="background:#fbb"
| 23 || May 9 || Dodgers || 2–5 (6) || Don Drysdale (3–2) || Art Mahaffey (2–3) || None || 11,483 || 6–17
|- style="background:#fbb"
| 24 || May 10 || Dodgers || 0–6 || Johnny Podres (5–0) || Frank Sullivan (1–3) || None || 8,170 || 6–18
|- style="background:#fbb"
| 25 || May 12 || Cardinals || 1–5 || Ernie Broglio (3–3) || John Buzhardt (0–3) || None || 5,463 || 6–19
|- style="background:#bfb"
| 26 || May 13 || Cardinals || 3–1 || Art Mahaffey (3–3) || Ray Sadecki (2–2) || None || 5,827 || 7–19
|- style="background:#bfb"
| 27 || May 14 || Cardinals || 6–4 || Chris Short (1–1) || Lindy McDaniel (2–2) || None || 4,276 || 8–19
|- style="background:#fbb"
| 28 || May 16 || Reds || 2–4 || Joey Jay (3–3) || Frank Sullivan (1–4) || None || 5,428 || 8–20
|- style="background:#fbb"
| 29 || May 17 || Reds || 1–2 || Bob Purkey (4–1) || John Buzhardt (0–4) || None || 4,641 || 8–21
|- style="background:#bfb"
| 30 || May 19 || Pirates || 4–1 || Art Mahaffey (4–3) || Bob Friend (4–4) || None || 16,035 || 9–21
|- style="background:#fbb"
| 31 || May 20 || Pirates || 3–4 || Joe Gibbon (3–2) || Robin Roberts (0–6) || Roy Face (6) || 12,547 || 9–22
|- style="background:#fbb"
| 32 || May 21 || Pirates || 11–13 || Bob Friend (5–4) || Don Ferrarese (0–1) || None || 9,291 || 9–23
|- style="background:#bfb"
| 33 || May 23 || @ Cubs || 2–1 (10) || Frank Sullivan (2–4) || Glen Hobbie (2–5) || Chris Short (1) || 2,179 || 10–23
|- style="background:#bfb"
| 34 || May 24 || @ Braves || 7–1 || Art Mahaffey (5–3) || Don Nottebart (2–3) || None || 9,120 || 11–23
|- style="background:#bbb"
| – || May 25 || @ Braves || colspan=6 | Postponed (rain); Makeup: July 5 as a traditional double-header
|- style="background:#bbb"
| – || May 26 || @ Reds || colspan=6 | Postponed (cold); Makeup: August 2 as a traditional double-header
|- style="background:#fbb"
| 35 || May 27 || @ Reds || 4–5 || Joey Jay (5–3) || John Buzhardt (0–5) || Jim Brosnan (5) || 7,690 || 11–24
|- style="background:#fbb"
| 36 || May 28 || @ Reds || 2–4 || Bob Purkey (5–2) || Frank Sullivan (2–5) || None || 6,632 || 11–25
|- style="background:#fbb"
| 37 || May 30 (1) || Braves || 1–3 || Bob Buhl (2–4) || Don Ferrarese (0–2) || None || see 2nd game || 11–26
|- style="background:#bfb"
| 38 || May 30 (2) || Braves || 11–4 || Art Mahaffey (6–3) || Carl Willey (2–1) || None || 28,783 || 12–26
|- style="background:#fbb"
| 39 || May 31 || Cubs || 4–5 || Bob Anderson (2–3) || Robin Roberts (0–7) || Don Elston (5) || 4,213 || 12–27
|-

|- style="background:#fbb"
| 40 || June 1 || Cubs || 3–10 || Glen Hobbie (3–5) || Frank Sullivan (2–6) || None || 3,785 || 12–28
|- style="background:#bfb"
| 41 || June 2 || @ Pirates || 6–0 || John Buzhardt (1–5) || Bob Friend (5–7) || None || 14,344 || 13–28
|- style="background:#fbb"
| 42 || June 3 || @ Pirates || 1–5 || Bobby Shantz (2–1) || Art Mahaffey (6–4) || Roy Face (7) || 11,153 || 13–29
|- style="background:#bfb"
| 43 || June 4 || @ Pirates || 5–0 || Don Ferrarese (1–2) || Vinegar Bend Mizell (4–3) || None || 27,352 || 14–29
|- style="background:#bfb"
| 44 || June 5 || @ Giants || 3–2 || Robin Roberts (1–7) || Mike McCormick (5–5) || None || 4,881 || 15–29
|- style="background:#bfb"
| 45 || June 6 || @ Giants || 13–9 || Dallas Green (2–3) || Billy O'Dell (1–3) || Ken Lehman (1) || 10,533 || 16–29
|- style="background:#fbb"
| 46 || June 7 || @ Giants || 3–4 (11) || Stu Miller (5–0) || Chris Short (1–2) || None || 6,048 || 16–30
|- style="background:#bfb"
| 47 || June 8 || @ Giants || 5–2 || John Buzhardt (2–5) || Sam Jones (5–5) || None || 5,703 || 17–30
|- style="background:#fbb"
| 48 || June 9 || @ Dodgers || 1–3 || Don Drysdale (4–3) || Frank Sullivan (2–7) || None || 19,110 || 17–31
|- style="background:#fbb"
| 49 || June 10 || @ Dodgers || 4–5 || Larry Sherry (2–2) || John Buzhardt (2–6) || None || 18,908 || 17–32
|- style="background:#fbb"
| 50 || June 11 || @ Dodgers || 3–6 || Sandy Koufax (9–2) || Art Mahaffey (6–5) || None || 18,833 || 17–33
|- style="background:#bfb"
| 51 || June 13 || Cardinals || 3–2 || Frank Sullivan (3–7) || Larry Jackson (2–6) || None || 7,327 || 18–33
|- style="background:#bbb"
| – || June 14 || Cardinals || colspan=6 | Postponed (rain); Makeup: August 29 as a traditional double-header
|- style="background:#fbb"
| 52 || June 15 || Cardinals || 3–6 || Ray Sadecki (5–4) || Art Mahaffey (6–6) || Bob Miller (2) || 6,789 || 18–34
|- style="background:#fbb"
| 53 || June 16 || Reds || 1–4 || Ken Hunt (7–3) || John Buzhardt (2–7) || Jim Brosnan (10) || 10,508 || 18–35
|- style="background:#fbb"
| 54 || June 17 || Reds || 5–10 || Bob Purkey (8–3) || Robin Roberts (1–8) || None || 5,205 || 18–36
|- style="background:#fbb"
| 55 || June 18 (1) || Reds || 2–7 || Howie Nunn (2–0) || Don Ferrarese (1–3) || None || see 2nd game || 18–37
|- style="background:#fbb"
| 56 || June 18 (2) || Reds || 0–10 || Jim O'Toole (6–6) || Chris Short (1–3) || None || 16,369 || 18–38
|- style="background:#fbb"
| 57 || June 20 || Pirates || 2–6 || Harvey Haddix (5–2) || Art Mahaffey (6–7) || Roy Face (10) || 10,649 || 18–39
|- style="background:#bbb"
| – || June 21 || Pirates || colspan=6 | Postponed (rain); Makeup: August 8 as a traditional double-header
|- style="background:#fbb"
| 58 || June 22 || Pirates || 1–5 || Bob Friend (8–7) || John Buzhardt (2–8) || None || 9,126 || 18–40
|- style="background:#bfb"
| 59 || June 23 || @ Pirates || 12–11 || Ken Lehman (1–0) || Earl Francis (0–2) || Frank Sullivan (1) || 16,170 || 19–40
|- style="background:#bfb"
| 60 || June 24 || @ Pirates || 6–2 || Chris Short (2–3) || Vinegar Bend Mizell (4–6) || Frank Sullivan (2) || 9,546 || 20–40
|- style="background:#fbb"
| 61 || June 25 (1) || @ Pirates || 5–10 || Roy Face (3–3) || Jack Baldschun (0–1) || None || see 2nd game || 20–41
|- style="background:#bfb"
| 62 || June 25 (2) || @ Pirates || 4–3 || Art Mahaffey (7–7) || Harvey Haddix (5–3) || Frank Sullivan (3) || 10,951 || 21–41
|- style="background:#bfb"
| 63 || June 26 || Giants || 1–0 || Jim Owens (1–0) || Jack Sanford (3–5) || Dallas Green (1) || 7,872 || 22–41
|- style="background:#fbb"
| 64 || June 27 || Giants || 5–12 || Juan Marichal (5–4) || John Buzhardt (2–9) || Stu Miller (7) || 10,728 || 22–42
|- style="background:#fffdd0"
| 65 || June 28 || Giants || 7–7 (15) || None || None || None || 11,597 || 22–42–1
|- style="background:#fbb"
| 66 || June 29 (1) || Giants || 7–8 (10) || Juan Marichal (6–4) || Frank Sullivan (3–8) || None || see 2nd game || 22–43–1
|- style="background:#fbb"
| 67 || June 29 (2) || Giants || 1–4 || Billy Loes (5–5) || Art Mahaffey (7–8) || None || 14,997 || 22–44–1
|- style="background:#fbb"
| 68 || June 30 || Dodgers || 6–10 || Stan Williams (7–7) || Jim Owens (1–1) || Turk Farrell (3) || 17,518 || 22–45–1
|-

|- style="background:#fbb"
| 69 || July 1 || Dodgers || 2–5 || Johnny Podres (8–1) || John Buzhardt (2–10) || Larry Sherry (11) || 19,064 || 22–46–1
|- style="background:#fbb"
| 70 || July 2 || Dodgers || 1–2 || Don Drysdale (6–5) || Art Mahaffey (7–9) || Turk Farrell (4) || 15,039 || 22–47–1
|- style="background:#fbb"
| 71 || July 4 (1) || @ Cardinals || 7–10 || Curt Simmons (3–7) || Don Ferrarese (1–4) || Mickey McDermott (4) || see 2nd game || 22–48–1
|- style="background:#bfb"
| 72 || July 4 (2) || @ Cardinals || 10–6 || Jack Baldschun (1–1) || Craig Anderson (1–1) || Frank Sullivan (4) || 14,653 || 23–48–1
|- style="background:#fbb"
| 73 || July 5 (1) || @ Braves || 4–5 (12) || Don McMahon (4–0) || Frank Sullivan (3–9) || None || see 2nd game || 23–49–1
|- style="background:#fbb"
| 74 || July 5 (2) || @ Braves || 0–4 || Lew Burdette (9–5) || Ken Lehman (1–1) || None || 14,280 || 23–50–1
|- style="background:#fbb"
| 75 || July 6 || @ Braves || 6–7 || Johnny Antonelli (1–4) || Don Ferrarese (1–5) || Don McMahon (5) || 10,439 || 23–51–1
|- style="background:#fbb"
| 76 || July 7 || @ Cubs || 3–9 || Don Cardwell (8–6) || Chris Short (2–4) || None || 5,356 || 23–52–1
|- style="background:#fbb"
| 77 || July 8 || @ Cubs || 4–6 || Jack Curtis (6–2) || Jim Owens (1–2) || Barney Schultz (5) || 11,645 || 23–53–1
|- style="background:#fbb"
| 78 || July 9 (1) || @ Cubs || 8–9 || Glen Hobbie (7–9) || Art Mahaffey (7–10) || Bob Anderson (3) || see 2nd game || 23–54–1
|- style="background:#fbb"
| 79 || July 9 (2) || @ Cubs || 5–8 (8) || Dick Ellsworth (4–6) || Chris Short (2–5) || None || 20,556 || 23–55–1
|- style="background:#bbcaff;"
| – || July 11 ||colspan="7" |1961 Major League Baseball All-Star Game at Candlestick Park in San Francisco
|- style="background:#fbb"
| 80 || July 13 || @ Dodgers || 2–7 || Stan Williams (9–8) || Art Mahaffey (7–11) || None || 14,238 || 23–56–1
|- style="background:#bfb"
| 81 || July 14 || @ Dodgers || 7–5 (10) || Jack Baldschun (2–1) || Roger Craig (3–6) || None || 13,871 || 24–56–1
|- style="background:#bfb"
| 82 || July 15 || @ Dodgers || 7–2 || Chris Short (3–5) || Sandy Koufax (11–6) || None || 8,062 || 25–56–1
|- style="background:#fbb"
| 83 || July 16 || @ Giants || 3–7 || Sam Jones (7–5) || Jim Owens (1–3) || Stu Miller (8) || 17,608 || 25–57–1
|- style="background:#bfb"
| 84 || July 17 || @ Giants || 10–7 || Jack Baldschun (3–1) || Bobby Bolin (2–1) || None || 10,401 || 26–57–1
|- style="background:#fbb"
| 85 || July 19 (1) || Braves || 5–8 || Bob Buhl (6–8) || Art Mahaffey (7–12) || Don McMahon (6) || see 2nd game || 26–58–1
|- style="background:#bfb"
| 86 || July 19 (2) || Braves || 2–1 || Don Ferrarese (2–5) || Carl Willey (3–4) || None || 19,818 || 27–58–1
|- style="background:#fbb"
| 87 || July 20 || Braves || 1–5 || Bob Hendley (3–2) || Chris Short (3–6) || None || 6,614 || 27–59–1
|- style="background:#bfb"
| 88 || July 21 || Cubs || 4–3 (10) || Jack Baldschun (4–1) || Barney Schultz (3–2) || None || 5,413 || 28–59–1
|- style="background:#bfb"
| 89 || July 22 || Cubs || 6–5 || Chris Short (4–6) || Glen Hobbie (7–11) || Jack Baldschun (1) || 2,956 || 29–59–1
|- style="background:#fbb"
| 90 || July 23 || Cubs || 5–11 || Don Elston (6–5) || Art Mahaffey (7–13) || None || 3,476 || 29–60–1
|- style="background:#fbb"
| 91 || July 25 || Dodgers || 2–7 || Sandy Koufax (13–6) || Don Ferrarese (2–6) || None || 10,391 || 29–61–1
|- style="background:#fbb"
| 92 || July 26 || Dodgers || 1–6 || Don Drysdale (8–6) || Jim Owens (1–4) || None || 10,058 || 29–62–1
|- style="background:#fbb"
| 93 || July 27 || Dodgers || 6–11 || Roger Craig (4–6) || Jack Baldschun (4–2) || Larry Sherry (14) || 8,415 || 29–63–1
|- style="background:#fbb"
| 94 || July 28 (1) || Giants || 5–8 || Dom Zanni (1–0) || Art Mahaffey (7–14) || Stu Miller (9) || see 2nd game || 29–64–1
|- style="background:#bfb"
| 95 || July 28 (2) || Giants || 4–3 || John Buzhardt (3–10) || Dick LeMay (2–4) || None || 19,558 || 30–64–1
|- style="background:#fbb"
| 96 || July 29 || Giants || 3–4 || Mike McCormick (9–9) || Don Ferrarese (2–7) || None || 8,667 || 30–65–1
|- style="background:#fbb"
| 97 || July 30 || Giants || 2–5 || Jack Sanford (6–5) || Jim Owens (1–5) || None || 8,347 || 30–66–1
|- style="background:#bbcaff;"
| – || July 31 ||colspan="7" |1961 Major League Baseball All-Star Game at Fenway Park in Boston
|-

|- style="background:#fbb"
| 98 || August 2 (1) || @ Reds || 2–4 || Jim O'Toole (11–8) || Art Mahaffey (7–15) || Bill Henry (13) || see 2nd game || 30–67–1
|- style="background:#fbb"
| 99 || August 2 (2) || @ Reds || 2–3 || Joey Jay (15–6) || Chris Short (4–7) || Sherman Jones (2) || 19,286 || 30–68–1
|- style="background:#fbb"
| 100 || August 3 || @ Reds || 1–7 || Ken Johnson (2–4) || John Buzhardt (3–11) || None || 9,625 || 30–69–1
|- style="background:#fbb"
| 101 || August 4 || @ Cardinals || 8–9 || Ernie Broglio (8–10) || Don Ferrarese (2–8) || Ed Bauta (2) || 8,749 || 30–70–1
|- style="background:#fbb"
| 102 || August 5 || @ Cardinals || 0–7 || Curt Simmons (6–7) || Paul Brown (0–1) || None || 7,140 || 30–71–1
|- style="background:#fbb"
| 103 || August 6 (1) || @ Cardinals || 1–3 || Ray Sadecki (9–5) || Frank Sullivan (3–10) || None || see 2nd game || 30–72–1
|- style="background:#fbb"
| 104 || August 6 (2) || @ Cardinals || 2–3 || Bob Gibson (8–8) || Jim Owens (1–6) || None || 18,784 || 30–73–1
|- style="background:#fbb"
| 105 || August 7 || Pirates || 1–3 || Bob Friend (11–13) || John Buzhardt (3–12) || None || 5,586 || 30–74–1
|- style="background:#fbb"
| 106 || August 8 (1) || Pirates || 2–10 || Harvey Haddix (8–5) || Art Mahaffey (7–16) || None || see 2nd game || 30–75–1
|- style="background:#fbb"
| 107 || August 8 (2) || Pirates || 2–3 || Tom Sturdivant (3–6) || Chris Short (4–8) || None || 11,081 || 30–76–1
|- style="background:#fbb"
| 108 || August 9 || Reds || 0–5 || Joey Jay (16–7) || Don Ferrarese (2–9) || None || 9,317 || 30–77–1
|- style="background:#fbb"
| 109 || August 11 || @ Pirates || 0–6 (7) || Bob Friend (12–13) || Robin Roberts (1–9) || None || 12,965 || 30–78–1
|- style="background:#fbb"
| 110 || August 12 || @ Pirates || 0–4 || Vinegar Bend Mizell (6–8) || Jim Owens (1–7) || None || 8,785 || 30–79–1
|- style="background:#fbb"
| 111 || August 13 || @ Pirates || 4–13 || Tom Sturdivant (4–6) || John Buzhardt (3–13) || None || 12,923 || 30–80–1
|- style="background:#fbb"
| 112 || August 14 || @ Cubs || 2–9 || Dick Ellsworth (6–7) || Frank Sullivan (3–11) || None || 5,608 || 30–81–1
|- style="background:#fbb"
| 113 || August 15 || @ Cubs || 5–6 || Jack Curtis (8–7) || Art Mahaffey (7–17) || Bob Anderson (5) || 5,878 || 30–82–1
|- style="background:#fbb"
| 114 || August 16 || @ Cubs || 5–9 || Don Cardwell (10–10) || Chris Short (4–9) || None || 6,390 || 30–83–1
|- style="background:#fbb"
| 115 || August 17 || @ Braves || 6–7 (11) || Don Nottebart (4–6) || Jack Baldschun (4–3) || None || 12,451 || 30–84–1
|- style="background:#fbb"
| 116 || August 18 || @ Braves || 1–4 || Lew Burdette (15–8) || Jim Owens (1–8) || None || 15,791 || 30–85–1
|- style="background:#fbb"
| 117 || August 19 || @ Braves || 3–4 || Tony Cloninger (4–2) || Frank Sullivan (3–12) || Don McMahon (7) || 10,574 || 30–86–1
|- style="background:#fbb"
| 118 || August 20 (1) || @ Braves || 2–5 || Warren Spahn (14–12) || Chris Short (4–10) || None || see 2nd game || 30–87–1
|- style="background:#bfb"
| 119 || August 20 (2) || @ Braves || 7–4 || John Buzhardt (4–13) || Carl Willey (5–7) || None || 24,637 || 31–87–1
|- style="background:#bfb"
| 120 || August 22 || Cubs || 6–0 || Art Mahaffey (8–17) || Dick Ellsworth (7–8) || None || 4,957 || 32–87–1
|- style="background:#bbb"
| – || August 23 || Cubs || colspan=6 | Postponed (wet grounds); Makeup: August 24
|- style="background:#bfb"
| 121 || August 24 || Cubs || 7–4 || Jim Owens (2–8) || Jack Curtis (8–9) || Don Ferrarese (1) || 2,773 || 33–87–1
|- style="background:#bfb"
| 122 || August 25 (1) || Braves || 9–4 || John Buzhardt (5–13) || Carl Willey (5–8) || None || see 2nd game || 34–87–1
|- style="background:#fbb"
| 123 || August 25 (2) || Braves || 4–9 || Tony Cloninger (5–2) || Frank Sullivan (3–13) || None || 13,037 || 34–88–1
|- style="background:#bbb"
| – || August 26 || Braves || colspan=6 | Postponed (rain); Makeup: August 27 as a traditional double-header
|- style="background:#fbb"
| 124 || August 27 (1) || Braves || 10–11 (12) || Bob Hendley (4–3) || Jim Owens (2–9) || None || see 2nd game || 34–89–1
|- style="background:#bfb"
| 125 || August 27 (2) || Braves || 3–0 || Art Mahaffey (9–17) || Bob Buhl (9–10) || None || 9,263 || 35–89–1
|- style="background:#fbb"
| 126 || August 28 || Braves || 1–7 || Warren Spahn (16–12) || Robin Roberts (1–10) || None || 6,346 || 35–90–1
|- style="background:#fbb"
| 127 || August 29 (1) || Cardinals || 4–5 || Curt Simmons (8–9) || John Buzhardt (5–14) || Ed Bauta (5) || see 2nd game || 35–91–1
|- style="background:#bfb"
| 128 || August 29 (2) || Cardinals || 4–3 || Chris Short (5–10) || Al Cicotte (2–5) || None || 8,592 || 36–91–1
|- style="background:#bfb"
| 129 || August 30 || Cardinals || 4–3 || Don Ferrarese (3–9) || Ray Sadecki (12–7) || None || 4,952 || 37–91–1
|- style="background:#fbb"
| 130 || August 31 || Cardinals || 1–2 || Bob Gibson (10–10) || Art Mahaffey (9–18) || None || 4,803 || 37–92–1
|-

|- style="background:#fbb"
| 131 || September 2 || Reds || 4–7 || Joey Jay (19–8) || John Buzhardt (5–15) || Bill Henry (16) || 4,147 || 37–93–1
|- style="background:#bfb"
| 132 || September 3 || Reds || 3–2 || Jim Owens (3–9) || Jim Maloney (6–6) || None || 4,752 || 38–93–1
|- style="background:#fbb"
| 133 || September 4 (1) || Reds || 0–5 || Ken Johnson (6–6) || Frank Sullivan (3–14) || None || see 2nd game || 38–94–1
|- style="background:#bfb"
| 134 || September 4 (2) || Reds || 5–3 || Art Mahaffey (10–18) || Ken Hunt (9–10) || None || 16,175 || 39–94–1
|- style="background:#fbb"
| 135 || September 5 || @ Braves || 4–5 (14) || Lew Burdette (16–9) || Frank Sullivan (3–15) || None || 8,018 || 39–95–1
|- style="background:#fbb"
| 136 || September 6 || @ Braves || 0–1 || Warren Spahn (18–12) || John Buzhardt (5–16) || None || 10,090 || 39–96–1
|- style="background:#fbb"
| 137 || September 8 || @ Cubs || 1–4 || Dick Ellsworth (8–10) || Art Mahaffey (10–19) || None || 1,533 || 39–97–1
|- style="background:#bfb"
| 138 || September 9 || @ Cubs || 6–2 || Jim Owens (4–9) || Jack Curtis (10–11) || None || 7,110 || 40–97–1
|- style="background:#bfb"
| 139 || September 10 || @ Cubs || 14–6 || Don Ferrarese (4–9) || Barney Schultz (7–4) || Frank Sullivan (5) || 7,628 || 41–97–1
|- style="background:#fbb"
| 140 || September 11 || @ Dodgers || 5–6 (11) || Ron Perranoski (7–5) || Don Ferrarese (4–10) || None || 9,064 || 41–98–1
|- style="background:#bfb"
| 141 || September 12 || @ Dodgers || 19–10 || Chris Short (6–10) || Sandy Koufax (15–11) || Jack Baldschun (2) || 8,629 || 42–98–1
|- style="background:#fbb"
| 142 || September 13 || @ Giants || 2–8 || Jim Duffalo (4–0) || Dallas Green (2–4) || None || 5,585 || 42–99–1
|- style="background:#bfb"
| 143 || September 14 || @ Giants || 4–3 (10) || John Buzhardt (6–16) || Dick LeMay (3–6) || None || 4,328 || 43–99–1
|- style="background:#fbb"
| 144 || September 16 || @ Reds || 2–3 || Jim O'Toole (16–9) || Jim Owens (4–10) || Jim Brosnan (15) || 8,376 || 43–100–1
|- style="background:#bfb"
| 145 || September 17 || @ Reds || 4–0 || Art Mahaffey (11–19) || Bob Purkey (16–11) || Frank Sullivan (6) || 14,671 || 44–100–1
|- style="background:#fbb"
| 146 || September 19 || @ Cardinals || 0–3 || Curt Simmons (9–10) || John Buzhardt (6–17) || None || 4,935 || 44–101–1
|- style="background:#bfb"
| 147 || September 20 || @ Cardinals || 6–1 || Don Ferrarese (5–10) || Ernie Broglio (9–12) || None || 5,113 || 45–101–1
|- style="background:#fbb"
| 148 || September 22 || Pirates || 2–3 || Clem Labine (4–1) || Frank Sullivan (3–16) || None || 4,687 || 45–102–1
|- style="background:#bfb"
| 149 || September 23 || Pirates || 5–4 (16) || Jack Baldschun (5–3) || Roy Face (6–12) || None || 4,005 || 46–102–1
|- style="background:#fbb"
| 150 || September 24 || Pirates || 3–4 || Vinegar Bend Mizell (7–10) || Chris Short (6–11) || Tom Sturdivant (1) || 3,282 || 46–103–1
|- style="background:#fbb"
| 151 || September 25 || Giants || 2–10 || Mike McCormick (13–16) || Don Ferrarese (5–11) || None || 3,416 || 46–104–1
|- style="background:#bfb"
| 152 || September 27 || Dodgers || 2–1 || Jim Owens (5–10) || Sandy Koufax (18–13) || Jack Baldschun (3) || 4,166 || 47–104–1
|- style="background:#fbb"
| 153 || September 28 || Dodgers || 0–10 || Don Drysdale (13–10) || Chris Short (6–12) || None || 3,651 || 47–105–1
|- style="background:#fbb"
| 154 || September 30 || Cardinals || 2–12 || Ray Washburn (1–1) || John Buzhardt (6–18) || None || 2,587 || 47–106–1
|-

|- style="background:#fbb"
| 155 || October 1 || Cardinals || 0–2 || Bob Gibson (13–12) || Don Ferrarese (5–12) || None || 2,496 || 47–107–1
|-

Roster

Player stats

Batting

Starters by position 
Note: Pos = Position; G = Games played; AB = At bats; H = Hits; Avg. = Batting average; HR = Home runs; RBI = Runs batted in

Other batters 
Note: G = Games played; AB = At bats; H = Hits; Avg. = Batting average; HR = Home runs; RBI = Runs batted in

Pitching

Starting pitchers 
Note: G = Games pitched; IP = Innings pitched; W = Wins; L = Losses; ERA = Earned run average; SO = Strikeouts

Other pitchers 
Note: G = Games pitched; IP = Innings pitched; W = Wins; L = Losses; ERA = Earned run average; SO = Strikeouts

Relief pitchers 
Note: G = Games pitched; W = Wins; L = Losses; SV = Saves; ERA = Earned run average; SO = Strikeouts

minor league system 

LEAGUE CHAMPIONS: Buffalo, Chattanooga

Notes

References 
1961 Philadelphia Phillies season at Baseball Reference

Philadelphia Phillies seasons
Philadelphia Phillies season
Philadelph